Ransiki is a town in Indonesia province of West Papua, at the western end of New Guinea. The town is the administrative  seat of the South Manokwari Regency. In 2010, there were 7,683 people in Ransiki, which rose to 16,245 at the 2020 census.
The town is served by Ransiki Airport.

History 
During World War II a ship sank off the Ransiki coastline.

Climate
Ransiki has a tropical rainforest climate with moderate to heavy rainfall year-round.

References 

Populated places in West Papua
Regency seats of West Papua (province)